Peter Keane is an American blues/folk musician who was born in Cincinnati, Ohio, in 1963.

Biography
He lives in Austin, Texas, and works as a computer programmer at the company Etsy. Bill Morrissey produced his second album, Walkin' Around. His albums contain original compositions as well as cover versions of songs written by Bob Dylan, Mississippi John Hurt, Bob Wills and Tim Hardin. In 2005, his web page said that he was "semi-retired" as a musician and that most of his recordings had been made available under a Creative Commons license.

Discography
 The Goodnight Blues (1992)
 Walkin' Around (1996)
 Another Kind of Blue (2000)
 Milton Street (2002)
 Rural Electrification (2015)

References

External links
 Official web site

Year of birth missing (living people)
Living people
University of Texas at Austin staff
American blues singers
American blues guitarists
American male guitarists
American folk musicians
American folk singers
American male singers
Songwriters from Texas
Musicians from Austin, Texas
Guitarists from Texas
Creative Commons-licensed authors
American male songwriters